The National Conference of Bankruptcy Judges is a professional organization for bankruptcy judges in the United States. The organization promotes cooperation among bankruptcy judges, organizes conferences, and provides legal education by funding research on insolvency and by publishing scholarship online and through the American Bankruptcy Law Journal.

References

Professional associations based in the United States